CFPT-FM (106.5 FM, "106.5 Elmnt FM") is an indigenous radio station in Toronto. Owned by First Peoples Radio, a subsidiary of the Aboriginal Peoples Television Network (APTN), it broadcasts music and talk programming targeting the First Nations community, with the former focusing upon both contemporary and indigenous musicians. The station launched on October 24, 2018 as a replacement for the city's Voices Radio station.

History 
In June 2017, the CRTC awarded licences for five new Indigenous radio stations in Calgary, Edmonton, Ottawa, Vancouver, and Toronto to replace the Voices Radio network (whose licenses were revoked in 2015 due to long-term compliance issues). The Ottawa (CFPO-FM) and Toronto licences were awarded to First Peoples Radio, a subsidiary of APTN, with the Toronto station inheriting Voices Radio's 106.5 FM frequency.

In June 2018, it was announced that the two First Peoples Radio stations would brand as Elmnt FM, and air a mixture of music and talk programming, including popular Pop, Rock, and R&B music. At least 25% of the music played by the station will be by indigenous Canadian musicians. Métis musician Janet Panic was announced as the Toronto station's evening host.

The station officially launched on October 24, 2018 as CFPT-FM.

In January 2022, broadcasters Mark Strong and Jemeni joined the station as cohosts of its morning show.

References

External links 

FPT
Radio stations established in 2018
2018 establishments in Ontario
FPT
Indigenous peoples in Toronto